Wayne School of Engineering is a high school in Goldsboro, North Carolina, USA. The school currently serves grades 6–12. Wayne School of Engineering is housed at Goldsboro High School and selects students through an application process which all rising freshmen and 6th graders in Wayne County are eligible for. The school opened August 8, 2007.

Curriculum 

Wayne School of Engineering's curriculum is based on collaboration, self-management, and relevance. Students are required to complete 15 hours of college credit and an internship. The 2007 school year started with A/B scheduling, but in 2008 has switched to 4×4 block scheduling.

Students may take online courses with NCVPS and Learn and Earn. As of the 2011–2012 school year, students can also take online or face-to-face classes at Wayne Community College or just online with Lenoir Community College.

References

Notable Student Work 

The Four Horseman and the Flapper (2020 short film) Freddie "Trey" Adams, Hannah Evelyn Cox, Lexton Lewis, Peyton Wilkins

Better Fuel Huell (2022 movie trailer) Unknown
Public high schools in North Carolina
Schools in Wayne County, North Carolina